Kopaszyna is a Polish coat of arms. It was used by several szlachta families in the times of the Polish–Lithuanian Commonwealth.

History

Blazon

Notable bearers
Notable bearers of this coat of arms include:
 Władysław Sikorski - (May 20, 1881 Tuszów Narodowy — July 4, 1943 Gibraltar) Polish military and political leader, General of army.

Sources 
 genealog.home.pl

See also

 Polish heraldry
 Heraldry
 Coat of arms

Kopaszyna